{{DISPLAYTITLE:C28H44O3}}
The molecular formula C28H44O3 (molar mass: 428.65 g/mol) may refer to:

 Ergosterol peroxide, a steroid derivative
 Nandrolone decanoate, an androgen and anabolic steroid medication